Peter Greenhill is a member of the Legislative Council of the Isle of Man, having been elected on 12 March 2020.

References 

Members of the Legislative Council of the Isle of Man
Year of birth missing (living people)
Place of birth missing (living people)
Living people